Green Lantern, formerly known as Chang, is a stand-up roller coaster located at Six Flags Great Adventure in Jackson Township, New Jersey. The  ride features five inversions and a duration of approximately 2 minutes. This steel coaster was designed and built by Swiss manufacturer Bolliger & Mabillard.

The ride originally operated at Kentucky Kingdom in Louisville, Kentucky from 1997 to 2009, where it was known as Chang. Upon opening in 1997, it set world records for this type of coaster in height, drop, speed, length and number of inversions. The introduction of the ride caused Kentucky Kingdom to achieve record attendance levels. After Six Flags abandoned Kentucky Kingdom in 2009, the ride was relocated to Six Flags Great Adventure. The ride debuted in 2011 as Green Lantern, replacing the former Great American Scream Machine roller coaster.

History

Chang (1997–2010)

Chang ("long" in Mandarin Chinese) opened at Six Flags Kentucky Kingdom on April 4, 1997, setting world records for this type of coaster in height, drop, speed, length and number of inversions. The ride was constructed by Martin & Vleminckx.

When it debuted, Chang had a yellow track and supports. Around 1999, its track was painted lime green and the support columns violet. In early 2006, the track was returned to its original yellow, while the supports were re-painted blue. Six Flags originally announced that the ride would have a Batman theme, along with its T2 coaster. T2 was expected to be known as "Batman: The Ride" and Chang "Riddler's Revenge", but those plans were later canceled.

Chang was removed over the weekend of September 19, 2009 for a proposed expansion of Splashwater Kingdom which was soon cancelled as Six Flags later announced plans to dispose of its Kentucky Kingdom property. The removal of Chang and the closure of Six Flags Kentucky Kingdom caused the owners of the park land (the Kentucky State Fair Board) to sue Six Flags for ownership of the rides. Kentucky Kingdom is now open under new operators as of May 24, 2014.

Green Lantern (2011–present)

In 2010, parts from Chang reportedly appeared at Six Flags Great America. The ride was planned to be moved to Six Flags Great America in 2011; the park obtained approval to exceed the  height limit imposed on the park, but plans were later dropped in favor of a water park expansion.

On July 5, 2010, Six Flags Great Adventure announced that its Great American Scream Machine would close on July 18 to make way for a new attraction the following year, sparking rumors that Chang would move there in 2011. Although Six Flags did not confirm the speculation, a first look at the park's new-ride layout from the Jackson Township zoning board meeting was posted on the JTown Magazine website and the layout was identical to that of Chang.

On September 16, Six Flags Great Adventure announced that it would open a Green Lantern-themed roller coaster in 2011 in honor of the 2011 film Green Lantern starring Ryan Reynolds as Hal Jordan. The specifications released for the new ride matched those of Chang. As part of the relocation, the ride would receive technical renovations and a new coat of paint.

Footers were poured for the ride in December 2010, with track installation beginning the following month. In January 2011, construction of the lift hill was completed. In April 2011 the final pieces of track were put in place.

On May 19, Green Lantern soft-opened to a select group of season-pass holders, media and families from Children's Miracle Network. The ride opened to the public on May 25.

Characteristics

Location
Green Lantern is located in the Boardwalk section of the park. Green Lantern is the third roller coaster to occupy this plot of land, following the Sarajevo Bobsled (which ran at Great Adventure from 1984 to 1988 before moving to Six Flags Great America and Great Escape) and the Great American Scream Machine (an Arrow Dynamics looping coaster which had occupied this area from 1989 to 2010). Like the Great American Scream Machine, the infield of Green Lantern is covered with gravel. The coaster also reuses the Scream Machine's queue area building.

Manufacturer
Green Lantern is Six Flags Great Adventure's fifth Bolliger & Mabillard roller coaster, joining Batman: The Ride, Medusa, Nitro and Superman: Ultimate Flight. The coaster is the park's second standup coaster; the first was a smaller coaster manufactured by Intamin, Shockwave, which operated from 1990 to 1992. Before Shockwave arrived at Great Adventure, the coaster was previously installed at Six Flags Magic Mountain from 1986 through 1988, preceding Riddler's Revenge.

Theme
As its name suggests, Green Lantern is themed for the DC Comics character of the same name. The theme was chosen to coincide with the Green Lantern film scheduled for release in 2011. The track is painted green, with the exception of the yellow vertical loop. The second corkscrew was originally the track section which was going to be yellow, but it was decided to switch the scheme to the first loop. The loop is yellow because Green Lantern's enemy is the yellow Parallax. In June 2011, a Parallax cutout with clutching arms through which the train passes was placed at the bottom of the first drop. The ride's queue area features a series of comic-book-style boards relating the story of Hal Jordan (the Green Lantern) and the Green Lantern Corps.

Trains
Green Lantern currently operates with two steel-and-fiberglass trains. Each train has seven cars with four seats in a single row, for a total of 28 riders. Riders are secured by an over-the-shoulder harness. Green Lantern originally operated with three trains but the park later reduced operation to two trains due to the trains "stacking" on the brake run. Although Green Lantern is a stand-up roller coaster, there is a small bicycle seat on which riders can lean.

Ride experience

The first section of Green Lantern is basically a mirrored version of Rougarou at  Cedar Point. Leaving the station, the train starts by climbing the  chain lift hill, on which the Green Lantern oath is played over loudspeakers along the steps. At the top, the train goes through a pre-drop before making a slightly-banked 180° turnaround. After this, the train goes down a  drop into a  vertical loop. Out of the loop, the track rises to the right into a  diving loop, hugging the first drop of Superman: Ultimate Flight. Riders then rise into a diving turnaround over the station, and the train enters a right-leaning  inclined loop. After a small hill, the train then rises to the left into the mid-course brake run. It then drops into a clockwise corkscrew, turning right and weaving through the diving loop. The track then makes a ground-hugging left turn and enters a low, second clockwise corkscrew. After a right turn the train makes a final, 180° left turn into the final brake run before returning to the station.

Records
At its opening, Chang claimed the record for the tallest vertical loop of any roller coaster in the world. At the time, it was the world's tallest, fastest and longest stand-up coaster. It also claimed records for the largest drop and the most inversions on a stand-up roller coaster. All of these records had eclipsed those set by Mantis, which opened at Cedar Point in 1996. In 1998 Riddler's Revenge opened at Six Flags Magic Mountain, surpassing each title held by Chang.

Reception
After Chang's 1997 opening at Kentucky Kingdom, the park saw a rise in attendance to a record of more than one million visitors. The previous record of about 730,000 was set in 1996. The ride was Kentucky Kingdom's marquee attraction.

After the ride's relocation to Six Flags Great Adventure, Brady MacDonald of the Los Angeles Times ranked it 8 of the park's 13 roller coasters. Mekado Murphy of The New York Times highlighted the different forces at play on a stand-up roller coaster, compared with a traditional one: "Other coasters create pressure mostly in your upper body; Green Lantern creates pressure in your legs, making them a much more active part of the experience". Both JTown Magazine and The Star-Ledger interviewed a number of park guests and coaster enthusiasts when the Green Lantern opened; all gave favorable reviews.

See also
 2011 in amusement parks
 Green Lantern: First Flight- A former ZacSpin roller coaster at Six Flags Magic Mountain

References

External links

Six Flags Great Adventure
Roller coasters operated by Six Flags
Roller coasters in New Jersey
DC Comics in amusement parks
Roller coasters introduced in 1997
Roller coasters introduced in 2011
Amusement rides that closed in 2009
Green Lantern in other media
Stand-up roller coasters manufactured by Bolliger & Mabillard